Niccolò Bonifazio (born 9 October 1993) is an Italian cyclist, who currently rides for UCI WorldTeam .

Career

Early career
Bonifazio was born in Cuneo.

Bonifazio's professional career began in 2013 when he rode as a stagiaire for UCI WorldTeam . He joined the  team the following year as a regular rider. In September 2014, Bonifazio took the biggest victory of his career so far by winning the Coppa Agostoni in a bunch sprint. In addition to this, he won a stage of the Tour of Japan and three stages and 2nd place of the Tour of Hainan.

In 2015, he booked another victory, the Gran Premio di Lugano, also in a sprint. Bonifazio placed 3rd in the Coppa Ugo Agostoni, which he won the preceding year. Bonifazio placed fifth in Milan–San Remo.

In August 2015 it was announced that Bonifazio would join  for the 2016 season. Bonifazio took multiple top 10 finishes, including 5th place in the Scheldeprijs, 3rd in the Cadel Evans Great Ocean Road Race and 6th in Kuurne–Brussels–Kuurne. He was named in the startlist for the Vuelta a España, but he abandoned on stage 7.

2018 onwards: Grand Tours
In May 2018, he was named in the startlist for the Giro d'Italia. In July 2019, he was named in the startlist for the 2019 Tour de France.

Major results

2010
 7th Trofeo San Rocco
 10th Piccola Tre Valli Varesine
2011
 1st GP dell'Arno
 1st Stage 3 Tour d'Istrie
2012
 9th Road race, UEC European Under-23 Road Championships
2013
 1st Stage 2 Coupe des nations Ville Saguenay
2014
 1st Coppa Ugo Agostoni
 1st Stage 6 Tour of Japan
 2nd Overall Tour of Hainan
1st  Points classification
1st Stages 2, 6 & 8
 6th Gran Premio Bruno Beghelli
 8th Coppa Sabatini
2015
 1st Gran Premio di Lugano
 1st Stage 7 Tour of Japan
 3rd Gran Premio della Costa Etruschi
 3rd Coppa Ugo Agostoni
 4th Grand Prix of Aargau Canton
 5th Milan–San Remo
 8th Coppa Bernocchi
 9th Vattenfall Cyclassics
2016
 1st Stage 3 Tour de Pologne
 3rd Cadel Evans Great Ocean Road Race
 5th Scheldeprijs
 6th Kuurne–Brussels–Kuurne
2017
 3rd Grand Prix of Aargau Canton
 4th Down Under Classic
2018
 1st Stage 1 Tour of Croatia
 9th EuroEyes Cyclassics
2019
 1st  Overall La Tropicale Amissa Bongo
1st  Points classification
1st Stages 1, 2 & 5
 1st Grote Prijs Jef Scherens
 1st Omloop Mandel-Leie-Schelde
 Vuelta a la Comunidad de Madrid
1st  Points classification
1st Stage 1
 10th Münsterland Giro
2020
 1st Stage 5 Paris–Nice
 1st Stage 2 Saudi Tour
 2nd Scheldeprijs
2021
 1st Grote Prijs Jef Scherens
 2nd Egmont Cycling Race
 3rd Paris–Bourges
 5th Kampioenschap van Vlaanderen
 7th Overall Boucles de la Mayenne
 9th Coppa Bernocchi
2022
 1st Stage 4 Route d'Occitanie
 4th Circuit de Wallonie
 9th Grote Prijs Marcel Kint

Grand Tour general classification results timeline

References

External links

1993 births
Living people
Italian male cyclists
European Games competitors for Italy
Cyclists at the 2019 European Games
People from Cuneo
Cyclists from Piedmont
Sportspeople from the Province of Cuneo